Luca Perregrini from the University of Pavia, Italy was named Fellow of the Institute of Electrical and Electronics Engineers (IEEE) in 2016 for contributions to numerical techniques for electromagnetic modeling.

References 

Fellow Members of the IEEE
Living people
Year of birth missing (living people)
Microwave engineers
Academic staff of the University of Pavia
Italian electrical engineers
Place of birth missing (living people)